Jianxi is a town of Shunchang County in Fujian province, China. , it has one residential community and 9 villages under its administration.

References

Township-level divisions of Fujian
Shunchang County